A , or Grand Sumo Tournament in English, is an official professional sumo tournament. Only honbasho results matter in determining promotion and relegation for rikishi (sumo wrestlers) on the banzuke ranking. The number of honbasho held every year and their length has varied; since 1958 there are six tournaments held over 15 consecutive days in four locations every year. Since 1926 the honbasho are organized by the Japan Sumo Association, after the merger of the Tokyo and Osaka sumo associations.

Etymology
The term honbasho means "main (or real) tournament", and is used to distinguish these tournaments from unofficial tournaments which are held as part of sumo tours, between the six major tournaments. Such display tournaments may have prize money attached but a wrestler's performance has no effect on his ranking. This type of sumo is often called hana-sumo ( flower-sumo) as it is not taken as seriously by the wrestlers.

History
In the Edo period, the locations of sumo tournaments and the rikishi (sumo wrestlers) who competed in them varied. Sumo was particularly popular in the cities of Edo, Kyoto, and Osaka; with tournaments held twice a year in Edo, and once a year in both Kyoto and Osaka. The tournaments lasted 10 days each.

In 1926, the newly-formed Japan Sumo Association increased the number of honbasho held each year from two to four. In 1928, they introduced rules such as marking uncontested bouts as forfeitures (fusenshō) to help guarantee tournaments end with a clear winner. A playoff structure was implemented in 1947 to decide a champion in the case of tied records. In 1949, the length of the tournaments was extended from 10 days to 15. In 1958, the number of honbasho held each year increased again, this time to six.

Before the 19th century, a wrestler's record at a tournament was of little consequence, and promotion through the banzuke ranks was more closely tied to popularity. In 1884, the Yomiuri Shimbun began publishing rudimentary summaries of honbasho results in their newspaper. The newspaper Jiji Shinpō began offering the first award for performances in 1889. Giving it to any wrestler who finished a tournament undefeated. Other newspapers quickly followed with their own awards. However, these prizes went unclaimed if no rikishi finished undefeated. Wanting a way to decide a definite winner each tournament, by 1900 daily newspapers such as the Osaka Mainichi Shimbun had begun bestowing awards on the wrestler with the best record of a honbasho. The term yūshō emerged to indicate a wrestler who had finished with a perfect record, but has since come to denote the tournament champion regardless of his record. Each division has a championship prize for the wrestler with the most wins. The winner of the top makuuchi division's honbasho receives a plethora of trophies and prizes from various organizations, regions and countries, but most notable is the 30kg sterling silver Emperor's Cup. Since 1947, three special prizes called sanshō may be awarded to wrestlers in the makuuchi division for exceptional performances during a honbasho.

Format

With honbasho lasting 15 days, sumo wrestlers ranked in the top two divisions (makuuchi and jūryō) wrestle once a day, while those of the lower divisions wrestle seven times total, approximately once every alternate day. The lower division matches begin at 8:30am. As honbasho results determine promotion and relegation on the banzuke, the first aim for most wrestlers is to achieve kachi-koshi, or a majority of wins, and thus ensure a promotion for the next tournament. A playoff on the final day is used to decide the winner in case of a tie.

Unless a playoff is required, two wrestlers will fight each other no more than once in a whole tournament. The bout schedule is set by a committee of toshiyori a day or two in advance of a tournament day, and may be announced from the dohyō the day prior by a senior gyōji. Although there is no fixed method, for the first half of a tournament the top makuuchi division will generally see its higher-ranked wrestlers (san'yaku) paired against its lower-ranked wrestlers (maegashira), with the rest of the maegashira fighting among ranks closer in strength. The schedule for the second half of the tournament will have mainly san'yaku fighting each other, with the remainder of the ranks determined by their win–loss records up to that point. One consideration is to minimize the necessity for a tie-breaking bout, particularly if a contender for the championship is lower-ranked and has thus far faced only other lower-ranked wrestlers.

Outside playoff bouts, neither wrestlers from the same heya (stable) nor wrestlers related by blood are scheduled to fight each other. For the second-highest jūryō division and below, the first half of a tournament will have wrestlers of similar rank competing against each other, while the second half will be determined by win–loss records.

If a wrestler has withdrawn due to injury or retirement from a scheduled bout, his opponent wins by default (fusenshō). A loss by default is known as fusenpai. Any remaining bouts that a wrestler misses will be regarded as losses when drawing up the next tournament's rankings. If a withdrawal results in an odd number of wrestlers in one division, the schedule is filled in by pairing a lower-ranked wrestler against a higher-ranked wrestler from the next-lowest division.

Schedule

The Ryōgoku Kokugikan is owned by the Japan Sumo Association and is therefore the only venue set up for sumo all year round. Preparing the other venues for their respective honbasho begins a week in advance. 2020's July and November tournaments and the March 2021 tournament were all held at the Ryōgoku Kokugikan in Tokyo to avoid unnecessary travel during the COVID-19 pandemic in Japan.

Former venues
The current Ryōgoku Kokugikan was opened in 1985. Prior to that an arena of the same name hosted honbasho in Tokyo from 1909 to 1946. From the 1950s through 1984, tournaments were held at the Kuramae Kokugikan in Tokyo.

Cancelled tournaments
The March 2011 tournament was cancelled due to the Japan Sumo Association launching an investigation into allegations of match-fixing involving several sekitori-ranked wrestlers. This was the first cancellation of a honbasho since 1946, when the May tournament was not held because of renovations to the Ryōgoku Kokugikan following damage sustained in World War II. The May 2011 tournament went ahead, but was described by the Sumo Association as a "technical examination" tournament rather than a full-fledged honbasho, with tickets given away for free in a lottery, and no prize money or trophies awarded.

The March 2020 tournament was conducted without spectators due to the recent COVID-19 pandemic in Japan and surrounding areas. It was the first time since World War II that a basho had been closed to the general public. The move followed a request from the Japanese Government that major public events be cancelled, postponed or scaled down in order to control the spread of the virus. The Sumo Association added that if any of the wrestlers during the tournament were found to be infected with COVID-19, the rest of the tournament would have been cancelled. The May tournament that year was cancelled as the pandemic continued in Japan.

See also
List of sumo tournament top division champions
List of sumo tournament second division champions
List of sumo record holders

References

External links
Official Grand Sumo Home Page.
Honbasho schedule at The Japan Times

Sumo terminology
Sports competitions in Japan
Recurring sporting events established in 1926
Martial arts competitions